Edward John Carroll (28 June 1874 - 28 July 1931), better known as E.J. Carroll, was an Australian theatre and film entrepreneur. He produced several films of Snowy Baker and Raymond Longford and helped establish Birch, Carroll and Coyle. Difficulties in securing international distribution for his films turned him away from production towards exhibition.

He was a partner, with his brother Daniel Joseph "Dan" Carroll (1886–1959) and Harry G. Musgrove (died 1951) in the Carroll-Musgrove partnership which, with financial assistance from George Marlow, founded the magnificent Prince Edward Theatre on Castlereagh Street, Sydney.

Filmography
For the Term of His Natural Life (1908) - producer
The Sentimental Bloke (1919) - distributor
On Our Selection (1920) - producer
The Man from Kangaroo (1920) - producer
The Jackeroo of Coolabong (1920) - producer
Ginger Mick (1920) - producer
The Shadow of Lightning Ridge (1921) - producer
The Blue Mountains Mystery (1921) - producer

References

External links

E.J. Carroll at Australian Dictionary of Biography
E. J. Carroll Biography at Australian Variety Theatre Archive
E.J. Carroll at National Film and Sound Archive

Australian film producers
1874 births
1931 deaths